Colin Fournier is co-architect with Peter Cook of the Kunsthaus Graz in Austria. Educated at the Architectural Association, Fournier was a founding member of Archigram.
 
He is also professor of Confluence Institute for innovation and Creative strategies in architecture, of The Bartlett School of Architecture, a part of University College London.

He was a faculty member at the School of Architecture, Chinese University of Hong Kong. He was an invited Visiting Professor at National University of Singapore in 2018.

References

21st-century British architects
Living people
Year of birth missing (living people)